The 1904–05 Drexel Blue and Gold men's basketball team represented Drexel Institute of Art, Science and Industry during the 1904–05 men's basketball season. The Blue and Gold, who played without a head coach, played their home games at Main Building.

Drexel participated in the Philadelphia Interscholastic League, also known as the Interscholastic Basketball Association, which also included Brown Preparatory School, Camden High School, Central High School, Central Manual Training School, Eastburn Academy, Friends' Central School, and Northeast Manual Training School. Spring Garden School was planned to participate, but was replaced by Friends' Central. All league games were played at St. James Hall, located at 38th and Market streets. Drexel finished 6-8 in these league games, which was won by Central High School with a record of 14–0.

Roster

In January, 1905, Machado suffered a broken hand and was replaced with Griffith

Schedule

|-
!colspan=9 style="background:#F8B800; color:#002663;"| Regular season
|-

References

Drexel Dragons men's basketball seasons
Drexel
Drexel
Drexel